A list of fantasy films released in the 1970s.

List

1970s
Fantasy